Mehmet Güçlü (born 14 March 1952) is a Turkish former wrestler who competed in the 1972 Summer Olympics.

References

External links
 

1952 births
Living people
Olympic wrestlers of Turkey
Wrestlers at the 1972 Summer Olympics
Turkish male sport wrestlers
Place of birth missing (living people)
World Wrestling Championships medalists
20th-century Turkish people